Year 939 (CMXXXIX) was a common year starting on Tuesday (link will display the full calendar) of the Julian calendar.

Events 
 By place 

 Europe 
 Hugh the Great, count of Paris, rebels against King Louis IV ("d'Outremer") and gains support from William I, duke of Normandy. Hugh, along with Herbert II, count of Vermandois, Arnulf I, count of Flanders and William pay homage to King Otto I (ruler of the East Frankish Kingdom), and support him in his struggle against Louis.
 July 19 – Battle of Simancas: Caliph Abd-al-Rahman III of Córdoba claims a Jihad ('Holy War') and raises an army of 100,000 men to end the Kingdom of León. He razes the cities of Medina del Campo, Ìscar and Alcazarén (previously abandoned by their population) and finally, reaches the city of Simancas (near modern-day Valladolid), where Christian forces under King Ramiro II wait for him. After three days, Ramiro defeats the Moorish army with an alliance of Castile and Navarre. Abd-al-Rahman orders a retreat along the Duero River, and is almost killed, due, most likely, to treason by Arab elements in the Moorish army.
 August 1 – Battle of Trans-la-Forêt: Bretons defeat Viking occupiers.
 August 5 – Battle of Alhandic: Abd-al-Rahman III defeats the garrison of those loyal to Ramiro II at Zamora, in the context of the Spanish Reconquista.
 October 2 – Battle of Andernach: Otto I crushes a rebellion against his rule, by a coalition of Eberhard III, duke of Franconia, and other Frankish dukes, in Andernach on the Rhine River. Otto prevails, with support from Odo of Wetterau. Eberhard is killed while Gilbert, duke of Lotharingia (or Lorraine) drowns when trying to escape.

 England 
 October 27 – King Æthelstan dies at Gloucester after a 15-year reign. He is buried at Malmesbury Abbey and succeeded by his half-brother, Edmund I ("the Magnificent"). After Æthelstan's death Olaf Guthfrithson (or his cousin, Anlaf Cuaran) a Viking leader who rules Dublin, is proclaimed king of York (south of Northumbria).

 Asia 
 Taira no Masakado, a Japanese nobleman, leads one of the largest insurgent forces in the Heian period against the imperial court at Kyoto. Masakado has acquired enough power to govern the Kantō region (northwest of Edo) and calls himself the 'new emperor' (shinnō).
 Ngô Quyền, who the previous year defeated the Chinese at the Battle of Bạch Đằng (938) thereby regaining Vietnamese independence after 1000 years, becomes king of Vietnam.

 By topic 

 Religion 
 July 13 – Pope Leo VII dies at Rome after a 3½-year reign. He is succeeded by Stephen VIII as the 127th pope of the Catholic Church.
 The Major Occultation (or Al-Ghaybah al-Kubra) of Muhammad al-Mahdi occurs (approximate date).

Births 
 November 20 – Tai Zong, emperor of the Song Dynasty (d. 997)
 Fujiwara no Takamitsu, Japanese waka poet (approximate date)
 Hai Gaon, Jewish theologian and rabbi (d. 1038)
 Hugh Capet, French king and a descendant of Charlemange (approximate date)

Deaths 
 January 21 – Yang Pu, emperor of Wu (b. 900)
 May 25 – Yao Yanzhang, general of Chu
 July 13 – Leo VII, pope of the Catholic Church
 August 29 
 Li Chunyan, empress of Min (Ten Kingdoms)
 Wang Jipeng, emperor of Min 
 October 2
 Eberhard III, duke of Franconia 
 Gilbert, duke of Lotharingia
 October 27 – Æthelstan, king of England

 November 28 – Lady Ma, Chinese noblewoman (b. 890)
 Ali ibn Babawayh Qummi, Twelver Shi'a scholar
 Ashot the Swift, prince of Tao-Klarjeti (Georgia)
 Pietro II Candiano, doge of Venice

References